Daniels House may refer to:

Daniels House (Bentonville, Arkansas)
Charles Daniels House, Chester, CT
O. J. Daniels House, Jerome, ID
Southwick-Daniels Farm, Blackstone, MA
Blake Daniels Cottage, Stoneham, MA
Frederick Daniels House, Worcester, MA
Mansfield A. Daniels House, Scobey, MT
John T. Daniels House, Manteo, NC
Josephus Daniels House, Raleigh, NC
Rogers-Bagley-Daniels-Pegues House, Raleigh, NC
E. J. and Alice Daniels House, Sioux Falls, SD, listed on the NRHP in South Dakota
Daniels Farm House, Rio Grande Village, TX
Pratt-McDaniels-LaFlamme House, Bennington, VT
Capts. Louis and Philomene Daniels House, Vergennes, VT

See also
Daniel House (disambiguation)